Chalakkal  is a village in Ernakulam district in the state of Kerala, India.

References

Villages in Ernakulam district